The 2010 Ford Ironman World Championship was held on October 9, 2010 in Kailua-Kona, Hawaii. It was the 34th  such Ironman Triathlon World Championships, which has been held annually in Hawaii since 1978. The 2010 Championship was won by Chris McCormack and Mirinda Carfrae. The championship is organised by the World Triathlon Corporation (WTC).

Medallists

Men

Women

Qualification
To enter for the 2010 World Championship race, athletes are required to qualify through performance at an Ironman or selected Ironman 70.3 race, through Hawaii residency, through a random allocation lottery, or by invitation from the WTC.

The Ironman 2010 Series consists of 24 Ironman qualifying races plus the Ironman World Championship 2009 which was itself a qualifier for the 2010 Ironman World Championship. The series started with Ironman Wisconsin 2009 held on September 13, 2009.

Qualifying Ironmans

2010 Ironman Series results

Men

Women

References

External links
Ironman website

Ironman World Championship
Ironman
Sports competitions in Hawaii
2010 in sports in Hawaii
Triathlon competitions in the United States